Uvaria is a genus of flowering plants in the family Annonaceae. The generic name uvaria is derived from the Latin uva meaning grape, likely because the edible fruit of some species in the genus resemble grapes.

Circumscription
Species are distributed throughout the Old World tropics. This large genus had about 150 species, but recent molecular analyses have revealed that several smaller genera belong within Uvaria, increasing its size.

These are climbing shrubs or small trees. The flowers are borne singly, in pairs, or in small clusters. There are six petals in two whorls and many stamens.

Selected species
[[File:山椒子(大花紫玉盤) Uvaria grandiflora -新加坡植物園 Singapore Botanic Gardens- (15534326432).jpg|thumb|Uvaria grandiflora in Singapore]]

There are 168 accepted Uvaria species, as of April 2021, according to Plants of the World Online.

 Uvaria chamae P.Beauv. – Finger-root, China
 Uvaria dulcis  - Tropical Asia (E. Indonesia, Jawa, Mainland Southeast Asia)
 Uvaria grandiflora Roxb. ex Hornem. - Indochina, Malesia
 Uvaria kweichowensis P.T.Li - Tropical Africa
 Uvaria narum (Dunal) Wall. - Indian subcontinent
 Uvaria rufa (Dunal) Blume; Susung-kalabaw, Australia to Philippines & Indochina
 Uvaria zeylanica L. - type species - India, Sri Lanka

Formerly placed here
 Kadsura japonica (L.) Dunal (as U. japonica L.)
 Cananga odorata (Lam.) Hook.f. & Thomson (as U. odorata Lam.)
 Oxandra lanceolata (Sw.) Baill. (as U.  lanceolata Sw.)
 Huberantha cerasoides (Roxb.) Bedd. (as U. cerasoides Roxb.)
 Monoon longifolium (Sonn.) Thwaites (as U. longifolia Sonn.)
 Xylopia aromatica (Lam.) Mart. (as U. aromatica'' Lam.)

References

External links

 
Annonaceae genera
Taxonomy articles created by Polbot